Aleksandr Shalvovich Porokhovshchikov (31 January 1939, Moscow – 15 April 2012, Moscow) was a Russian film and theatre actor and film director, People's Artist of Russia (1994). He died of diabetes and other illness at age 73 in Russia.

Selected filmography
 Empire under Attack (Империя под ударом, 2000) as Vladimir Dzhunkovsky
 The Rifleman of the Voroshilov Regiment (Ворошиловский стрелок, 1999) as police colonel Pashutin
 Tax Сollector (Мытарь, 1995) as Potocky
 Professor Dowell's Testament (Завещание профессора Доуэля, 1984)
 Return from Orbit (Возвращение с орбиты, 1983) as Alexey  Sviridov, Major General
 Moon Rainbow (Лунная радуга, 1983) as Back
 Do Not Part with Your Beloved (С любимыми не расставайтесь, 1980) as Nikulin
 The Captivating Star of Happiness (Звезда пленительного счастья, 1975) as Pavel Pestel
 Captain Nemo (Капитан Немо, 1975) as Captain Faragut
 At Home Among Strangers (Свой среди чужих, чужой среди своих, 1974) as Kungarov
 Shine, Shine, My Star (Гори, гори, моя звезда, 1970) as white officer

References

External links
 

1939 births
2012 deaths
Russian male film actors
Russian film directors
Russian male stage actors
Academicians of the Russian Academy of Cinema Arts and Sciences "Nika"
Male actors from Moscow
Deaths from diabetes
People's Artists of Russia